Rhinebeck may refer to:
 Rhinebeck (village), New York
 Rhinebeck (town), New York
 Old Rhinebeck Aerodrome, a living museum in Red Hook, New York
 Rhinebeck and Connecticut Railroad
 New York State Sheep and Wool Festival, held in Rhinebeck, New York

See also
 Reinbek